Gobindobhog is a rice cultivated mostly in West Bengal in India. It is a short grain, white, aromatic, sticky rice having a sweet buttery flavor. It derives its name from its usage as the principal ingredient in the preparation of the offerings to Govindaji, the family deity of the Setts of Kolkata.

Gobindobhog was traditionally cultivated in the districts of Bardhaman, Hooghly, Nadia and Birbhum. Later, it began to be cultivated in Bankura and Purulia. 

It is also grown in other states. For instance:

 In Bihar it is cultivated in Kaimur, naugachia and other rice bowl areas.
 In Northern Districts of Chhattisgarh it is cultivated in Sarguja Division and is called Vishnu Bhog or Govind Bhog. It is known to have been the favorite rice of Hon' President of India Dr. Rajendra Prasad, where King of Sarguja regularly sent it to the Rashtrapati Bhavan, Delhi from Ambikapur.

Geographical indication 
In August 2017, the Gobinobhog rice was allotted the geographical indication tag of West Bengal by the Government of India.

It has many traditional Bengali recipes intended for it specifically.

References 

Rice varieties
Indian cuisine
Rice production in India
Economy of West Bengal
Geographical indications in West Bengal